Tudhope is a surname.

Notable people with this surname include:
 Ben Tudhope, Australian Paralympian
 Daniel Tudhope, Scottish jockey
 George Ranken Tudhope, Scottish pathologist
 James Brockett Tudhope, Canadian politician
 John Henry Tudhope, South African flying ace
 Philip Tudhope, South African flying ace